Too Young to Love is a 1959 British drama film set in New York. It was directed by Muriel Box and starring Pauline Hahn, Joan Miller, and Austin Willis. It was based on the play Pickup Girl by Elsa Shelley. An adaptation of the story was broadcast on British TV on 6 December 1957 in the ITV Television Playhouse series.

Plot 
In New York, a policeman and a neighbour watch as a middle-aged man and a young man enter a house where a young girl can be seen getting ready for bed. After the young man leaves, the policeman enters the house to make an arrest. In a juvenile court hearing, it emerges that the 15-year-old Elizabeth has been found in a compromising position in her bedroom with a 47-year-old man, Mr Elliot. Elizabeth is one of four children in a struggling working-class family, her mother a hard-working cook, her father ran into debt while he was unemployed and found a job working in California. In the evenings, at the home of an older girl Ruby Lockwood, teenagers have frequent dance and necking parties, sometimes attended by older men. Eventually, Elizabeth recounts her story (in flashback) before the judge. Elizabeth's life is grim and joyless, and she has been neglected after the constant absence and lack of guidance from her parents. Led astray by Ruby, she has sex with a sailor and has an abortion. The judge is sympathetic, but a report sent to the judge puts Elizabeth's fate in the balance.

Cast

Critical reception 
TV Guide wrote, "(Thomas) Mitchell does all he can to keep this picture from failing, but it's not enough...this is hurt mainly by its excess of courtroom scenes."

References

External links 
 
 

1959 films
1959 drama films
1950s legal films
British drama films
British legal films
British courtroom films
Films about abortion
Films about prostitution in the United States
Films directed by Muriel Box
Films produced by Herbert Smith (producer)
Films produced by Sydney Box
Films set in New York (state)
Juvenile sexuality in films
Legal drama films
Films with screenplays by Muriel Box
Films with screenplays by Sydney Box
Films shot at British National Studios
1950s English-language films
1950s British films